Lehurutshe (formerly known as Welbedacht) is a town in Ngaka Modiri Molema District Municipality in the North West province of South Africa. The town has within its vicinity the Lehurutshe campus of Taletso TVET, a fire station and numerous schools.

Primary Education, there is a list of primary schools in the town and the surrounding namely R.B Dithupe Intermediate, Babuseng Primary and  Mesega Primary schools.
The town has only one High School in its area, the rest being in the surrounding villages. The High School serving the area is Ngotoane High School.
The town is home to the Lehurutshe campus of the Taletso TVET college, which has campuses in other towns around the province.

Lehurutshe District Hospital is located in the town, and serves the surrounding villages of Dinokana, Khunotswane, Madutle, Matlhase, Radikhudu, Gopane, Motswedi, Borakalalo, Driefontein, Lobatla, Moshana, Supingstad and Ntsweletsoku.

References

Populated places in the Ramotshere Moiloa Local Municipality